Katsuhiko Okamoto is a Japanese inventor who specializes in modifications of the Rubik's Cube. Since 2001 he has created 31 such puzzles.

Okamoto Cubes

An incomplete list of Okamoto's inventions:

Floppy Cube - a 3x3x1 cube
Scramble Cube - a modified Floppy Cube, with a diamond-shaped centrepiece
Slimtower - a 2x2x3 cube, Okamoto's first invention
Void Cube - a hollow 3x3x3 cube without centrepieces, which uses a rail mechanism to move cubies
Bevel Cube - identical to the independently developed Helicopter Cube, which appears to be a 2x2x2 cube with 8 triangles per face
Latch Cube - a 3x3x3 with directional constraints on its edges.

References

External links
Okamoto's official website (in Japanese)

Toy inventors
Puzzle designers
Japanese inventors
Rubik's Cube
Living people
Year of birth missing (living people)